

Children's Museum of Denver at Marsico Campus 
The Children's Museum of Denver at Marsico Campus is located in downtown Denver at 2121 Children’s Museum Drive, Denver, Colorado, United States. The 46,902 square foot building is located on a 9-acre campus and has 20 exhibits and approximately 450,000 visitors annually. The museum focuses on early childhood education, serving children newborn through age eight and their caregivers through interactive exhibits and educational programming. Its core early learning focus areas include: Science, Technology, Engineering and Math (STEM), Health and Wellness, 21st Century Skills, Literacy and the Arts. The museum is a member of the Association of Children’s Museums. The mission of the Children’s Museum of Denver at Marsico Campus is to create extraordinary experiences that champion the wonder and joy of childhood.

History 

The museum was founded in June 1973 in a traveling bus. In 1975 the museum moved into a renovated building on Bannock Street and then moved to its current location along the South Platte River in 1984. In 2015, the museum was made Early Childhood Education Zone’s list of top 25 children’s museums in the United States, coming in at number 11.

In the spring of 2014, the Children’s Museum of Denver broke ground on a $16.1 million expansion. Following several years of planning and two years of construction, the expansion doubled the size of the museum and included 8 additional exhibits, 1 outdoor and 7 indoor. The expanded Museum stayed open during the expansion with its grand reopening on  November 20, 2015, as the Children’s Museum of Denver at Marsico Campus.

Operations 
The Children’s Museum of Denver at Marsico Campus is a 501(c)(3) private non-profit organization and a Tier II Scientific and Cultural Facilities District member. As an organization, the museum works to raise approximately 40% of its revenue through fundraising events, grants, donations and corporate sponsorships and to earn the other 60% through admissions, membership sales and other fee-based programs. The museum’s FY16 budget is $6,159,790.
A board of directors acts as advisors for the museum. A Museum Leadership Team is led by the President and CEO and consists of the Chief Museum Officer, Chief Financial Officer, Vice President of Development and Communications, Senior Director of Guest Services and Facilities, Director of Exhibits and Director of Education. Over 80 employees work for the museum. Additionally, hundreds of volunteers give their time to the museum annually.

Museum accessibility 
The museum has accommodations for visitors with disabilities, including scheduled time for children with disabilities and their families to visit the museum in a quiet environment. Museum admission during these times is limited and exhibit lights and sounds are turned down.

Sponsored Admissions and Memberships Program
Childcare centers and elementary schools in which 50% or more of the student population is eligible for the National School Lunch Program qualify to receive free educational programs led by Museum educators. In addition, participating children are offered a free year-long family membership. Approximately 15,000 students received sponsored admissions to the museum in 2015.

SNAP Initiative
In January 2015, the Children’s Museum of Denver at Marsico Campus started a pilot program to offer lower admission, $1 per person, for families who receive Supplemental Nutrition Assistance Program benefits. As of December 2015, the museum had served 17,096 guests through the program.

Growing Scientists Collaborative
This collaborative program provides science learning experiences for early elementary school students coming from low-income families in partnership with the Denver Botanic Gardens and Butterfly Pavilion. The program includes teacher trainings, curriculum support, in-school outreach programming, field trips, provision of science supplies and annual family passes to these informal education institutions. It is evaluated by an objective third party with focus groups and surveys of various parties involved (teachers, parents, administrators, etc.) The program began in 2003 as G.R.O.W. (Growing Respect by Observing our World) and received the 2006 Environmental Education Award for Excellence for nonprofit organizations from the Colorado Alliance for Environmental Education.

Museum pedagogy 
Constructivism as a theory of learning was established by developmental psychologist Jean Piaget, whose research demonstrated that children construct and reconstruct knowledge through firsthand interactions with materials and phenomena. According to Piaget, learning and conceptual knowledge cannot be imparted through the passive receipt of information. For a child to make sense of the world, they need to explore and experiment for themselves. Like Jean Piaget, Russian psychologist Lev Vygotsky believe that children learn through active experiences in their environment and that during play, children are able to think in more complex and abstract ways.

Based on this understanding of play and child development, the museum includes educational programming and exhibits to allow for open-ended play. Additionally, the museum recognizes the importance of the roles of parents and caregivers in a child’s development and designs exhibit spaces to include adult engagement.

Permanent exhibits 

The museum's exhibits focus on STEM, Health and Wellness, 21st Century Skills, Literacy and the Arts.

Altitude	is an indoor 3½ story climber. The climber houses a retired mountain gondola from Keystone, CO and a swaying monkey bridge. At the bottom of the climber is Box Canyon, a climber for younger children.

The Art Studio	includes activities using clay, paint and other media. The studio hosts four visiting Artists in Residence each year.

Assembly Plant has real tools and work benches to assemble projects made of recycled materials donated by people in the community. Blueprints of suggested projects are available.

Bubbles consists of bubble-making devices to teach about evaporation and water vapor.

Center for the Young Child includes experiences for children three and under and houses The Nest, a low-sensory studio.

Energy includes activities focused on energy sources such as wind, solar and fossil fuels. Components of the exhibit include a solar energy station, hot air balloon launch, rocket launch and an air cannon.

Fire Station No. 1 includes a retired fire truck and a 911 call center.

Joy Park: An Outdoor Adventure is a 30,000 sq ft outdoor exhibit that contains various activity spaces that were designed in collaboration with Denver Parks and Recreation.

Kinetics!  is a physics exhibit that features a tube system and balls that demonstrate motion and kinetic energy.

My Market consists of a fresh produce market and kitchen to emphasize local food and the farm-to-table process.

The Teaching Kitchen includes daily programming centered on health food recipes.

Water is a 2,220 square foot exhibit that features activities based on an urban water system.

References

Children's museums in Colorado
Museums in Denver